Juan Lloveras (born 2 August 1955) is a Spanish hurdler. He competed in the men's 400 metres hurdles at the 1980 Summer Olympics.

References

1955 births
Living people
Athletes (track and field) at the 1980 Summer Olympics
Athletes from Catalonia
Spanish male hurdlers
Olympic athletes of Spain
People from Vilanova i la Geltrú
Sportspeople from the Province of Barcelona
Mediterranean Games bronze medalists for Spain
Mediterranean Games medalists in athletics
Athletes (track and field) at the 1975 Mediterranean Games